UTC+04:30 is an identifier for a time offset from UTC of +04:30. This time is used only in Afghanistan, so it is also called Afghanistan Standard Time.

As standard time (year-round)

South-Central Asia
 Afghanistan – Afghanistan Time (AFT)

Principal cities: Kabul, Kandahar, Herat, Mazar-i-Sharif

References 

UTC offsets
Time in Afghanistan